Sitapur district is one of the districts which is situated in Uttar Pradesh state of India, with Sitapur town as the district headquarters. Sitapur district is a part of Lucknow division.

History 
Sitapur was first constituted as a district by the British after their takeover of Oudh State in February 1856. Before that, under the Mughal Empire and then the Nawabs of Awadh, the area had been divided between multiple administrative units. Even earlier, under the Delhi Sultanate, it appears that the territory of the current district was part of the province of Bahraich, but this is unclear because contemporary sources do not mention this area.

During the reign of Akbar, the area of today's Sitapur district was divided between four sarkars, all in the Subah of Awadh. Most of it was in the sarkar of Khairabad: this area comprised the mahals of Haveli Khairabad, Hargam, Laharpur, Biswan, Machhrehta, Sitapur (called "Chhitiapur" in the Ain-i-Akbari), Sadrpur, Nimkhar (a large territory including the later parganas of Aurangabad, Misrikh, and Maholi), and Kharkila (later Korauna). The later pargana of Gundlamau is "untraceable" but was probably divided between Nimkhar and Machhrehta. In addition, the pargana of Chandra was then part of Gopamau in today's Hardoi district, which was also in Khairabad sarkar. A few mahals belonged to Lucknow sarkar: Bari, Manwan, Bahrimau (later Pirnagar; name changed under Jahangir), Bangaon, and Ramkot (included in Lucknow for some reason, although surrounded on all sides by Khairabad). Additionally, the mahal of Fatehpur, in today's Barabanki district, included part of Mahmudabad pargana, which now forms part of Sitapur. The mahal of Qila Nawagarh, comprising the later parganas of Tambaur and Kondri North, was part of Bahraich sarkar; finally, Kondri South was part of Sailuk mahal in the sarkar of Awadh.

A few parganas would be established later: for example, Mahmudabad was split off from Fatehpur, during the reign of Jahangir, and Kondri was formed out of Sailuk in 1739, during the reign of Saadat Khan I. Aurangabad pargana, originally part of Nimkhar, was split off by the taluqdars Muhammad Bakhsh and Qutb Muhammad several generations after the town's foundation in 1670.

The basic administrative setup, though, remained intact until the reign of Asaf-ud-Daula in the late 1700s. Under the later Mughal emperors and then the Nawabs of Awadh, Khairabad remained a relatively unimportant command, rarely mentioned in contemporary sources. It was not a very prestigious posting — when Safdar Jang appointed his subject Hidayat Ali Khan as faujdar of Khairabad, Hidayat Ali Khan was less than enthusiastic. Later, Asaf-ud-Daula divided his country into various chaklas and nizamats; the three chaklas that included areas of Sitapur district were Muhamdi, Khairabad, and Bari-Biswan.

After the British annexed Awadh in 1856, they selected Sitapur to serve as the headquarters of a new district in Khairabad division. The area between the Chauka and Ghaghra rivers briefly formed a separate district based at Mallanpur, which was part of Bahraich Division. It was decided before the 1857 uprising to abolish Mallanpur district, but it was not carried out until 1858 after the end of the conflict, and the parts south of the Dahawar were annexed to Sitapur.

From then on, and still in effect as of the early 1900s, Sitapur consisted of four tehsils and 21 parganas: Misrikh tehsil in the west (with parganas Maholi, Chandra, Misrikh, Aurangabad, Korauna, Machhrehta, and Gundlamau), Sitapur tehsil in the north and center (with parganas Sitapur, Ramkot, Pirnagar, Khairabad, Hargam, and Laharpur), Sidhauli tehsil in the south and southeast (with parganas Bari, Manwan, Mahmudabad, Sadrpur, and Kondri South), and Biswan tehsil in the east (with parganas Biswan, Tambaur, and Kondri North).

Geography 
Sitapur is located at 27.57°N 80.68°E. It test has an average elevation of 138 meters (452 feet).  It is located in the Gangetic Plain, with elevations ranging from 150 m above sea level in the north-west to 100 m in the south-east. It is intersected by numerous streams and ravines and contains many shallow ponds and natural reservoirs, which overflow during the rainy seasons, but become dry, in some places, in the hot season. Except in the eastern portion, which lies in the doabs between the Kewani and the Chauka, and the Ghaghra and the Chauka rivers, the soil is semi arid. Even this moist tract is interspersed with patches of land covered with saline efflorescence called reh.

Drainage 
The monotony of featureless plain of upper Ganga valley is preserved throughout the district. At places this monotony is broken by Small River like Kathana, Sarayan and Gomati. Sandy stretches are found along the rivers and locally known as s. the region in general is a part of well integrated system of the river Ganga. Gomti is the most important tributary flows in the eastern part of the district and engulfs above mentioned small rivers. Ghaghara forms the eastern boundary of the district. There are five rivers flowing through the district of Sitapur: Gomti, Kathana, Pirai, Sarayan, Ghaghra and Sharda.

Climate 
The gradual rise in temperature starts in the months of February and becomes more rapid by March and April unless checked by more humid easterlies. The condition is aggravated further by presence of meager relative humidity (40%). The district of the study does not show much influence of Himalaya which otherwise tend to lower the temperatures in the places nearby as in the case of Meerut and Gonda.

The rainy season commences in the latter half of the June at different dates which are too difficult to be predicted. It brings relief to the people by lowering the temperatures up to 30 °C. The rainfall decreases southward and westward in the region. There is a dominance of Bay of Bengal currents. This season comes to an end by October with a sudden fall in temperature and amount of rainfall. Soon after the winter conditions settle in at times cold waves and westerly disturb the general monotony of the winters. The showers due to western depressions are very useful for the  crop in the region. The average rainfall in the study area varies between 105 cm to 150 cm.

Political and administrative divisions 
The district is divided into seven tehsils namely Sitapur, Biswan, Maholi, Mishrikh, Laharpur, Mahmudabad and Sidhauli and 19 blocks namely Pisawan, Maholi, Misrikh, Machhrehta, Gondlamau, Ailiya, Hargaon, Parsendi, Khairabad, Laharpur, Behta, Reusa, Sakran, Biswan, Pahala, Mahmudabad, Rampur Mathura, Kasmanda and Sidhauli. There are 2348 census villages and 1329 Gram Panchayats in the district. Sitapur has nine seats in Uttar Pradesh Vidhan Sabha. These nine constituencies are:
 Biswan,
 Hargaon,
 Laharpur,
 Mahmoodabad,
 Maholi,
 Misrikh,
 Sevata,
 Sidhauli and
 Sitapur,

The district is divided into four Lok Sabha seats:
 Sitapur Lok Sabha constituency includes Sitapur, Laharpur, Biswan, Sewta and Mahmoodabad Vidhan Sabha seats,
 Dhaurahra Lok Sabha constituency includes Maholi and Hargaon Vidhan Sabha seat from Sitapur district,
 Mohanlalganj Lok Sabha constituency includes Sidhauli Vidhan Sabha seat from Sitapur district,
 Misrikh Lok Sabha constituency includes Misrikh seat from Sitapur district.

Demographics 

As of 2011 India census, Sitapur district has population of 4,483,992 of which male and female are 2,375,264 and 2,108,728 respectively. District Sitapur ranks 8th in terms of population in Uttar Pradesh. The density of Sitapur district for 2011 is 781 people per km2. In 2001, it was about 630 people per km2. Sitapur town/city has a population of 1,77,351. Males constitute 52.67% of the population and females 47.41%. Sitapur has an average literacy rate of 61%, lower than the national average of 74.04%. Female literacy is about 50%. In Sitapur, 16.6% of the population was under 6 years of age. Sitapur has a sex ratio of 888 females per 1000 males. Scheduled Castes made up 32.26% of the population. There are 801,764 households in the district accounting for 2.4 percent of the total households in the state. The average size of households in the district is 5.6 persons.

Urbanization 
Out of the total Sitapur population, the percentage share of urban population in the district is 11.8% as against 22.3 percent of the population in urban areas of the state. The district has 12 towns out of them 11 are statutory and one town is a census town.

According to housing census, 2011, total 723 families live on footpath or without any roof cover in the district. The total Population of all who lived without roof at the time of Census 2011 is 3,460. This is approximately 0.08% of the total population of Sitapur district.

In 2006 the Ministry of Panchayati Raj named Sitapur one of the country's 250 most backward districts (out of a total of 640). It is one of the 34 districts in Uttar Pradesh currently receiving funds from the Backward Regions Grant Fund Programme (BRGF).

Religion 

Hindus constitute about 79% of total population of the district and Muslims are about 20% of the total population. In Sitapur, Hindus and Muslims work together in the carpet industry. The district has a concentration of fakirs.

Languages

At the time of the 2011 Census of India, 93.12% of the population in the district spoke Hindi (or a related language) and 5.62% Urdu as their first language.

Languages spoken here include Awadhi, a vernacular in the Hindi continuum spoken by over 98 million people, mainly in the Awadh region. Sanskrit, Punjabi and English are also understood among a minuscule minority. Apart from Hindi, English is now part of curricula in most government and private schools.

Agriculture 
Agriculture is the primary activity in the district, with wheat, rice, and urad being the staple crops with sugarcane, mustard and groundnuts as cash crops. The crop area of peppermint is also rapidly increasing especially in eastern part of the district. Narrow tracts of sandy soils in the valley of rivers produce potato, groundnuts and ginger. Banana plantations are becoming popular among farmers recently.

Industry 
As far as industries are concerned, most of them are based on raw agricultural products. Plywood, sugar, paper, rice, flour mills are scattered all over the district. There are several sugar mills, mostly owned by private firms. The only cooperative sugar mill in the town of Maholi closed down a few years ago due to loss.

Sugar mills 
There are several sugar mills in the district.

Hargaon sugar mill 
Located in the heart of Hargaon town, it is also known as the Oudh Sugar Mills Limited (OSML). It belongs to the renowned K.K. Birla Group of Sugar Companies. It has a crushing capacity of about 10,000 tonnes of sugarcane per day. It also produces 100 kiloliter per day industrial alcohol/ethanol in its distillery and 15 MW electricity using its co-gen power plant.

Ramgarh sugar mill 
Also known as Dalmia Chini Mill, it was the first sugar plant of Dalmia Group established in the year 1994 in the village Ramgarh which is approximately 40 kilometers from the district headquarter in Sitapur town. This plant has a cane crushing capacity of 7500 tonnes of sugarcane per day and an installed generation capacity of 25 MW. The mill started its first cane crushing on 28 December 1994 to manufacture plantation white sugar, using the double sulphitation process. It also has co-generation facility. The export of electricity started in October 2007. Co-generation takes place only during crushing season simultaneously with production of white sugar.

Jawaharpur sugar mill 
Apart from the unit at Ramgarh village, Dalmia Group in 2007 set up another unit in a village near Ramkot town which is only 14 kilometers away from Sitapur on the Sitapur-Hardoi Road. The Jawaharpur sugar factory unit has a cane crushing capacity of 100000 tonnes of sugarcane per day and co-gen capacity of 27 MW. It also has a distillery capacity of 80 kiloliter per day.

Biswan sugar factory 
The Seksaria Sugar Factory, a private limited company composed of members of the Seksaria family, located in Biswan town. It was established in 1939.

Mahmudabad sugar mill 
The Kisan Sahkari Chini Mills Limited, Mahmudabad was established under U.P. Cooperative Societies Act, 1965 and its first crushing season was 1982–83.

Kamlapur sugar mill 
The Kamlapur mill in has a capacity of crushing 4,000 tonne of sugar cane a day and also a 6 MW power generating plant.

Other industries

Kraft Paper Plant 
J. B. Daruka Papers Limited have set up a Kraft Paper Plant near a village called Advenia Grant. It consists of an agro-based paper plant (Capacity 50 TPD).

Transportation

Rail network 
The district is traversed by broad gauge train network connecting Gorakhpur and Delhi via Gonda, Burhwal, bypassing Lucknow and Hardoi. The major towns of the district Sidhauli, Mishrikh, Maholi, Hargaon, Biswan, Mahmudabad etc.are well connected with rails. Tamabur-Ahmedabad is not connected with rails. Broad Gauge conversion from Lucknow to Sitapur and Mailani has been completed and Lucknow to Sitapur commenced on 09-Jan-2019.

Road network 

Towns and villages within the district are now well-linked through major district roads (MDR) and metaled rural roads. Most of the roads are in good condition. The National Highway No. 24 (Lucknow - Delhi) passes from the heart of Sitapur district. This highway is open to public.

Nearest airport 
Sitapur does not have any airport of its own. Chaudhary Charan Singh International Airport, Lucknow is the nearest airport. It takes almost an hour and a half to reach Sitapur by car.

Historical places 
According to Hindu mythology, Puranas were written by Rishi Ved Vyas at Vyas Gaddi in modern-day Naimisharanya. Sitapur is one of the five sacred places the Hindus have to visit in their Panch Dham Yatra journey. Misrikh, near Naimisharanya, holds its religious significance due to the belief that Maharshi Dadhichi donated his bones to Devatas for making Vajras.
 Mishrikh is a religious place  from Namisharanya. Maharishi Dadhichi Asharam and Sitakund are holy pilgrimage of this place.
 Namisharanya is a centre of religious and knowledge. There are 30,000 religious sites here. Some important holy places at Namisharanya are as follows:
Suraj Kund Temple is near to Nawab Nagar, Akabarpur, a famous temple of SHIV JI, Bajrang Bali
 Pachhakhare BABA is near to Nyamupur Kalan, a famous temple of Shiv, Hanuman, and Durga. Om Sai Dham, Gayatri Mandir is also famous at Nyamupur.
 Chakratirth is the holiest in the Naimisharanya. It is said that Lord Vishnu's chakra fell on this pious land and created a round kund which is named Chakra Tirth.
 Goshai Baba: (Khairullapur)
 Lalita Devi Temple is one of the Shaktipeeths.
 Panch Prayag: This pond is situated near the Lalita Devi temple.
 Hanuman Gharhi: This is near Lalita Devi temple.
 Manu Shatroopa Temple: This is situated near Vyas Gaddi.
 Dev Puri: This is situated near Railway Station.
 Tirupati Mandir: This is situated near Dev Puri.
 Aanand Bhawan: It has 18 Upnishad and Purans kept.
 Shyamnathan Mandir: This Shiv Temple was built 300–400 years ago in old Sitapur City (Munshiganj). The temple has the Nagar style of temple architecture.
 Vyas Gaddi is located near sitapur in Mishrikh tehseel where Rishi Vyas divided Vedas into four parts.
 Jangli Nath Baba is located near Police Line crossing. It is a temple of Shiva.
 Khairabad: A small town famous for its Sufi heritage. Dargah bade Maqdoom saheb is one of them. Imaambara Makka jamadaar, ghuyya Tali, Imam bara Aaga Ali, Niazia school, Pakka bagh, Dargah chote Maqdoom and Dargah Hafiz Mohd. Ali shah.
 Karam court: The place where the famous badminton player Karam Gopichand practiced badminton in the early years of his career. Now people is visiting this place to start their 'Vidyarambha' in Badminton. People collect the soil where Karam's footprints were once made. He is now practising in the Tampines stadium in Singapore. Sitapur is more famous by its alias 'Karamgrad' among Russians.
 Shivshakti Mandir in Jogapur, Thangaon
 Sidhauli has a famous ancient Lord Shiva temple.
And many more temples in the villages in the district where annual fairs are organised.

Famous personalities 

 Acharya Narendra Dev
 Fazl-e-Haq Khairabadi
 Jan Nisar Akhtar, Urdu poet
 Salman Akhtar, psychoanalyst
 Muztar Khairabadi, Urdu poet
 Manoj Kumar Pandey, Param Veer Chakra
 Raja Todar Mal, finance minister and one of the Navratn in Emperor Akbar's court
 Wajahat Mirza, screenwriter and film director, won Filmfare awards for Mughal-e-Azam and Ganga Jamuna
 Dr. Ganesh Dutt Saraswat, Doctorate in Hindi Literature, Renewed poet and author 
Mahesh Prasad Mehray, Padma Vibhushan, founder of Sitapur Eye Hospital 
Narottam Das, poet
Abhijeet Pratap Singh,Poet

Filmography
1. Umrao Jaan (2006 film) 
2. Dedh Ishqiya
3. Kagaz (Shooting Near Biswan)

Photography

References

External links
 Sitapur district website

 
Districts of Uttar Pradesh
Lucknow division